The 2014 Malaysia Grand Prix Gold was the fourth grand prix gold and grand prix tournament of the 2014 BWF Grand Prix Gold and Grand Prix. The tournament was held in Pasir Gudang Corporation Stadium, Pasir Gudang, Johor, Malaysia from 25–30 March 2014 and had a total purse of $120,000.

Players by nation

Men's singles

Seeds

Finals

Top half

Section 1

Section 2

Section 3

Section 4

Bottom half

Section 5

Section 6

Section 7

Section 8

Women's singles

Seeds

Finals

Top half

Section 1

Section 2

Bottom half

Section 3

Section 4

Men's doubles

Seeds

Finals

Top half

Section 1

Section 2

Bottom half

Section 3

Section 4

Women's doubles

Seeds

Finals

Top half

Section 1

Section 2

Bottom half

Section 3

Section 4

Mixed doubles

Seeds

Finals

Top half

Section 1

Section 2

Bottom half

Section 3

Section 4

References

Malaysia Masters
Pasir Gudang
Malaysia
Malaysia Grand Prix Gold
Sport in Johor